Peter G. Tsouras is a military historian and author. A Greek-American, he served in the United States Army and retired with the rank of lieutenant colonel. He served in armor, military intelligence, and civil affairs assignments. He currently works as a senior analyst with the Battelle Corporation and resides in Alexandria, Virginia.  He has written extensively in the field of military alternative history.

Selected works

Author
Alexander: Invincible King of Macedonia
Britannia's Fist: From Civil War to World War - An Alternate History
A Rainbow of Blood: The Union in Peril
Bayonets, Balloons, & Ironclads: Britain and France Take Sides with the South
Changing Orders: The Evolution of the World's Armies, 1945 to the Present
Disaster at D-Day: The Germans Defeat the Allies, June 1944
Disaster at Stalingrad: An Alternate History
Gettysburg: An Alternate History
The 'Great Patriotic War': The Illustrated History of the Soviet Union at War With Germany, 1941-1945
Hancock
Montezuma: Warlord of the Aztecs 
United States Army: A Dictionary
Warlords of the Ancient Americas: Central America
Warlords of Ancient Mexico: How the Mayans and Aztecs Ruled for More Than a Thousand Years

Editor
Anvil of War: German Generalship on the Eastern Front
Battle Of The Bulge: Hitler's Alternate Scenarios
Civil War Quotations: In the Words of the Commanders
Cold War Hot: Alternative Decisions of the Cold War
Dixie Victorious: An Alternate History of the Civil War
Fighting in Hell: the German Ordeal on the Eastern Front
The Greenhill Dictionary of Military Quotations
Hitler Triumphant: Alternate Decisions [Histories] of World War II
Operation Just Cause: U.S. Intervention in Panama (co-edited with Bruce W. Watson)
Panzers on the Eastern Front: General Erhard Raus and His Panzer Divisions in Russia, 1941-1945
Rising Sun Victorious: The Alternative History of How the Japanese Won the Pacific War
Third Reich Victorious: Alternate Decisions of World War II
Warrior's Words: A Quotation Book - From Sesostris III to Schwarzkopf, 1871 B.C.-1991 A.D.

References

21st-century American historians
21st-century American male writers
American military writers
American book editors
Alternate history writers
United States Army officers
Writers from Alexandria, Virginia
Living people
Place of birth missing (living people)
American writers of Greek descent
1948 births
Historians from Virginia
American male non-fiction writers